Heinkenborstel is a municipality in the district of Rendsburg-Eckernförde, in Schleswig-Holstein, Germany.

The location of Heinkenborstel is south of the municipality of Bargstedt, but north of Mörel, and east of Nindorf, Rendsburg-Eckernförde.

References

Municipalities in Schleswig-Holstein
Rendsburg-Eckernförde